Equinox Express Elevator is an album by American guitarist Howard Roberts recorded in 1972 for the Impulse! label.

Reception
The Allmusic review awarded the album 3 stars.

Track listing
All compositions by Howard Roberts except as indicated
 "Unfolding In" (Roberts, Mike Wofford, Dave Grusin) – 5:13
 "Timelaps" – 1:51
 "T T T T" (Roberts, Ed Michel) – 4:43
 "Growing National Concern" – 3:53
 "2dB, Eyes of Blue" – 2:03
 "(The Single) (On This Side)" – 3:03
 "Real Freak of Nature Historical Monument" – 3:21
 "Slam"  5:34
 "Harold J. Ostly, The Country Tax Assessor" – 3:53
 "Unfolding In (On Itself)" (Roberts, Wofford, Grusin) – 1:39

The album jacket also lists "the reoccurring free rhythm tune – Mavro".

Personnel
Howard Roberts - electric guitar, 12 string guitar, acoustic guitar, synthesizer guitar,  vocals
Dave Grusin - organ
Mike Wofford - electric piano
Ed Michel - synthesizer
Jerry Scheff - electric bass
Mayuto Correa - percussion
Diana Lee - vocals

References

Impulse! Records albums
Howard Roberts albums
1972 albums
Albums produced by Bill Szymczyk